Thomas Ligon (born September 10, 1940) is an actor of Cajun ancestry. He appeared in the films Paint Your Wagon, Jump,  and Bang the Drum Slowly (in which he also sang the title song) as well as the television series The Young and the Restless, and Oz.

Life and career
Mentored by folksinger and actor Gordon Heath in Paris, beginning in the mid 1950s, Ligon then attended St. Albans School (Washington, D.C.), where he suffered a broken leg while playing football, and, sans sports, his interests turned solidly toward theater. At Yale, where he was a member of Skull and Bones and graduated as an English major (1962), he was discovered by Tennessee Williams, who saw his performance as Kilroy in Williams' play, Camino Real at the Yale Dramatic Association. Ligon became one of the most sought after young actors in New York in the 1960s.

Ligon has appeared on many prominent regional stages in the U.S., notably the Arena Stage where he played the title role in Billy Budd and in Hard Travelin'  by Millard Lampell in 1964, and Actors Theatre of Louisville, where he played Hank Czerniak, the polka king, in Evelyn and the Polka King.

Tom Ligon and Katharine Dunfee Clarke (K.C. Ligon - 1948-2009) were married on New Year's Eve in 1976.  K.C. was born into a theatrical family (her mother was actress and dialect coach Nora Dunfee and her father was veteran Broadway and noir film actor, David Clarke).  She made her Broadway debut in Under Milk Wood at the age of eight, and subsequently appeared with her parents in the National Tour of The Visit with Alfred Lunt and Lynn Fontanne. K.C. taught speech at Circle in the Square Theatre School and was a dialect coach on Broadway and did extensive private coaching of prominent performers for theater and film.  A writer and leader of the modern Oxfordian movement, K.C. was deeply involved in the effort to establish Edward de Vere, 17th Earl of Oxford as Shakespeare.

Tom Ligon created the role of Orson in the prize-winning Off-Broadway musical Your Own Thing (1968), and starred on Broadway opposite Geraldine Page in Angela, by Sumner Arthur Long, and with Sandy Duncan in John Patrick's Love is a Time of Day.  This work on stage led to appearing in two films, Paint Your Wagon and Bang the Drum Slowly.  Concerning Ligon's third film, Jump (1971): Quentin Tarantino called it "this amazing film that no one’s ever seen – I’ve only seen it once and I’d love to see it again – this really good Seventies backtrack exploitation movie... It’s hilarious and very satirical. I remember really liking that."

Ligon played the Tiger in Rajiv Joseph's Bengal Tiger at the Baghdad Zoo in its original iteration, directed by Giovanna Sardelli at the Lark Play Development Center in New York City. Other noteworthy appearances on the New York stage include Geniuses, BAFO (Best and Final Offer), Den of Thieves, The Golf Ball, Tartuffe: Born Again, A Backer's Audition, Another Paradise, and Have I Got A Girl for You.

At the age of 60, Ligon appeared in a critically acclaimed New York production of Our Town, directed by Jack Cummings III, where he played George Gibbs, with an actress of the same age playing Emily Webb. Also, for Transport Group, he subsequently played in Requiem For William, All the Way Home, and The Audience, all directed by Jack Cummings III.

In August 2013, when Ligon was age 72, The New York Times reported that he sent an intruder tumbling to the pavement below with a fist to the forehead and a ninja shout after the man had entered his Greenwich Village apartment through a window. Responding to later news that it was a "career burglar" he had chased away, and who was now in jail, Ligon told The Times: "Well, I guess he's not having much of a 'career' right now. It's like acting – you’ve got your ups and downs."

Ligon served many years as SAG-AFTRA's Chair, National Seniors Committee.
He has also served as a member of the Board of Directors, New York Screen Actors Guild (2005–07).

Filmography

Film
 Nothing But a Man (1964) - Teenager #1
 Paint Your Wagon (1969) - Horton Fenty
 Jump (1971) - Chester Jump
 The Last American Hero (1973) - Lamar
 Bang the Drum Slowly (1973) - Piney Woods
 Joyride (1977) - Sanders
 Young Doctors in Love (1982) - Soap Cameos
 Cutting Class (1989) - Mr. Ingalls
 I Believe in America (2007) - Oliver
 Serial (2007) - Chief Joseph Spataford
 Lost Revolution (2007) - Oliver
 Front Cover (2015) - Gus LaMar

Television
 Hawk (1966)
 The 39th Witness (TV film) (1968)
 The Jackie Gleason Show  "Operation Protest" (1970)
 A World Apart (original cast, 1969-1971) 
 Medical Center (1971)
 The Execution of Private Slovik (TV film) (1974)
 F. Scott Fitzgerald in Hollywood (TV film (1975)
 The Black Box Murders (TV film) (1975) 
 Judge Horton and the Scottsboro Boys (TV film) (1976)
 The Adams Chronicles (1976)
 Baretta (1977) 
 Rosetti and Ryan (1977) 
 Charlie's Angels (1977) 
 Police Woman (1977)
 Starsky and Hutch (1977) 
 The Young and the Restless (1978-1982)
 Baa Baa Black Sheep (1978) 
 Loving (original cast, 1983-1984)
 The Demon Murder Case (TV film) (1983)
 Santa Barbara (1987) 
 Dallas (1987) 
 The American Experience – "Simple Justice" (TV Film) (1993) 
 All My Children (1994) 
 Another World (1990, 1995)
 Oz (2001–2003)
 Law & Order: Special Victims Unit (2001) 
 Law & Order (1995–2003) 
 Law & Order: Criminal Intent (2007)
 The Heart, She Holler (original cast, 2011–2013)

References

External links

1940 births
Living people
Male actors from New York City
20th-century American male actors
21st-century American male actors
Male actors from New Orleans
American male film actors
American male television actors
American male voice actors
American male Shakespearean actors
American male stage actors
Oxfordian theory of Shakespeare authorship
Yale University alumni
American expatriates in France
St. Albans School (Washington, D.C.) alumni